VMware Carbon Black (formerly Bit9, Bit9 + Carbon Black, and Carbon Black) is a cybersecurity company based in Waltham, Massachusetts. The company develops cloud-native endpoint security software that is designed to detect malicious behavior and to help prevent malicious files from attacking an organization. The company leverages technology known as the Predictive Security Cloud (PSC), a big data and analytics cloud platform that analyzes customers’ unfiltered data for threats.

The company has approximately 100 partners. It has over 5,600 customers including approximately one-third of the Fortune 100.

In October 2019, the company was acquired by VMware.

History
Carbon Black was founded as Bit9 in 2002 by Todd Brennan, Allen Hillery, and John Hanratty. The company's first CEO was George Kassabgi. The current CEO, Patrick Morley, was formerly the chief operating officer of Corel. He took over the position in 2007.

In 2013, the company's network was broken into by malicious actors who copied a private signing key for a certificate and used it to sign malware.

In February 2014, Bit9 acquired start-up security firm Carbon Black. At the time of the acquisition, the company also raised $38.25 million in Series E funding, bringing Bit9’s total venture capital raised to approximately $120 million. The company acquired Objective Logistics in June 2015. In August 2015, the company announced that it had acquired data analytics firm Visitrend and would open a technology development center in downtown Boston. A month later, the company announced it would partner with SecureWorks, Ernst & Young, Kroll, Trustwave, and Rapid7 to provide managed security and incident response services.

The company changed its name to Carbon Black on February 1, 2016, after being known as "Bit9 + Carbon Black" for approximately two years.

In July 2016, Carbon Black announced it had acquired next-generation antivirus software provider Confer for an undisclosed sum. Prior to the deal, Confer had raised $25 million in venture funding and had more than 50 employees. According to The Wall Street Journal, the deal was valued at $100 million.

On May 4, 2018, the company joined public markets, listing as "CBLK" on the Nasdaq exchange. As part of its initial public offering (IPO), Carbon Black raised approximately $152 million at a valuation of $1.25 billion. Prior to its IPO, the firm had raised $190M from investors including Kleiner Perkins, Highland Capital, Sequoia, Accomplice, and Blackstone.

In October 2019, the company was acquired by VMware for $2.1 billion.

References

External links
 

Software companies based in Massachusetts
Companies based in Waltham, Massachusetts
Software companies established in 2002
2002 establishments in Massachusetts
Computer security companies
Computer security software companies
Companies formerly listed on the Nasdaq
2018 initial public offerings
2019 mergers and acquisitions
VMware
Software companies of the United States